The  is an unofficial golf event held every December at the Glissando Golf Club Narita, Chiba, Japan. The tournament is a unique stroke play event, and, as the name suggests, pits teams from the Japan Golf Tour, the LPGA of Japan Tour, and PGA Senior Tour. The teams were made of five tour members from 2005 to 2009 and six members since 2010. The title sponsor is Hitachi.

Winners

See also
Wendy's 3-Tour Challenge (similar American golf event)
Japan Golf Association

External links
 

Unofficial money golf tournaments
Golf tournaments in Japan
Team golf tournaments
2005 establishments in Japan
Recurring sporting events established in 2005
Tourist attractions in Chiba Prefecture